Happy Valley is an unincorporated community and census-designated place in Eddy County, New Mexico, United States. Its population was 519 as of the 2010 census. The community is located on the western edge of Carlsbad; New Mexico State Road 524 passes through the area. The town was settled as a farming community before potash was manufactured here. It was named because the lack of land use regulations made residents happy.

Geography
The community is approximately two miles west of the west edge of Carlsbad.

Demographics

Education
It is within the Carlsbad Municipal School District, which operates Carlsbad High School.

References

Census-designated places in New Mexico
Census-designated places in Eddy County, New Mexico